Callebaut may refer to:

Companies
Barry Callebaut, cocoa producer
Callebaut, Belgian chocolate brand, subsidiary of Barry Callebaut

People
Anna Callebaut, Belgian racing cyclist
Doris Callebaut, Indonesian actress
Jan Callebaut, Belgian market researcher
Jelita Callebaut, Indonesian actress, daughter of Doris Callebaut
Marijke Callebaut, Belgian football player
Troely Callebaut, Indonesian actress 
Vincent Callebaut, Belgian architect
Werner Callebaut, Belgian philosopher of science